Satyapal Singh Saini is a member of the Bharatiya Janata Party and has won the 2014 Indian general elections from the Sambhal (Lok Sabha constituency). In 2020 He became the BJP Vice President of Uttar Pradesh and Member of the Legislative Council (MLC) from Moradabad - Bijnor in 2022.

Political career

May, 2014: Elected to 16th Lok Sabha
1 Sep. 2014 onwards: Member, Standing Committee on Agriculture
15 Sep. 2014 onwards: Member, Committee on Members of Parliament Local Area Development Scheme (MPLADS); Member, Consultative Committee, Ministry of Rural Development, Panchayati Raj and Drinking Water and Sanitation
In 2020 he Became the BJP vice president of Uttar Pradesh
In 2022 He Became a member of the Legislative Council from Moradabad - Bijnor seat

References

1973 births
Living people
India MPs 2014–2019
Lok Sabha members from Uttar Pradesh
People from Sambhal district
Bharatiya Janata Party politicians from Uttar Pradesh
Members of the Uttar Pradesh Legislative Council